Zuzana 155 mm  Gun Howitzer is a Slovak artillery system developed by KONŠTRUKTA-Defence, a.s., with a 45-caliber gun and automatic loader for loading of both projectile and charge. It is an evolution of the 152mm SpGH DANA self-propelled howitzer.

The gun has a long range high accuracy and high rate of fire, it can be prepared promptly for firing, and it has a high level of mobility ensured by a modified Tatra 8×8 chassis. The design of the gun means it can use any NATO standard 155 mm ammunition. The fire control system allows for a multiple-round simultaneous-impact (MRSI) mode. One of the unique features of Zuzana is that the gun is mounted externally in between two totally separated compartments of the turret. This makes the crew inherently safe from any potentially dangerous mechanics of the gun and autoloader plus the crew is protected from the gases generated during firing.

Variants

155 mm ShKH vz. 2000 Zuzana
The original wheeled version adopted by the Slovak Army in 1998.

155 mm ShKH M2000G Zuzana
A modified version made for the Hellenic Army, later resold to Cyprus. Armed with lighter 7.62 mm roof-mounted machine guns.

155 mm ShKH Zuzana 2
Updated version with a new 52-calibre gun, full 360-degree turret traverse and a new armored cab. It has passed Slovak Army trials in December 2009. Slovak army had ordered 25 vehicles (to be delivered in year 2021 and 2022).

The new version is claimed to possess Multiple Rounds Simultaneous Impact (MRSI) capability.

155 mm ShKH Himalaya
1990's adaptation of the original system to a tracked chassis required by export customers. It is essentially a Zuzana turret mounted on a T-72 chassis.
The tracked version so far did not achieve orders beyond initial evaluation units and further production is unlikely.

155 mm ShKH Diana
A joint project between Slovak Konstrukta Defence (Slovakia) and Bumar-Labedy (Poland). Uses Zuzana 2 turret on UPG-NG tracked chassis. A prototype showcased on International Defence Industry Exhibition in Poland in Kielce in 2015.

Specifications

Current operators
 : 16 Zuzana 2000, 25 Zuzana 2
 : 12 Zuzana M2000G, bought from Greece
 : 24 Zuzana 2 bought in two consecutive deals. First order of 8 confirmed in May 2022 by the Slovak minister of defence Jaroslav Naď, with training of crews starting right away. The first order was completed as of 18 January 2023, per statement by the Slovak minister of defence Jaroslav Naď. The second order of 16 units was signed on 2 October 2022, with Denmark, Germany and Norway providing the funding.

Former operators
 : 12 Zuzana M2000G, all sold to Cypriot National Guard

See also
EVA (howitzer)
Archer
DRDO ATAGS
ATMOS 2000
A-222 Bereg
2S22 Bohdana
CAESAR
DANA
G6 Rhino
AHS Kryl
Nora B-52
PCL-09
PCL-161
PCL-181
PLL-09
Type 19
List of artillery

References

 

Self-propelled artillery of Slovakia
Science and technology in Slovakia
155 mm artillery
Wheeled self-propelled howitzers
Military vehicles introduced in the 1990s